The 1994 Connecticut gubernatorial election included Republican John G. Rowland winning the open seat following the retirement of A Connecticut Party Governor Lowell Weicker. The election was a four-way race between A Connecticut Party Lieutenant Governor Eunice Groark, Republican U.S. Congressman John G. Rowland, Democrat state comptroller Bill Curry, and independent conservative talk show host Tom Scott. Rowland won the election with just 36% of the vote.

Democratic primary

Candidates 
Bill Curry, Connecticut State Comptroller
John B. Larson, Member of the Connecticut Senate

Results

Republican primary

Candidates 
John G. Rowland, former U.S. Representative for CT-05
Pauline R. Kezer, Secretary of the State of Connecticut

Results

General election

Candidates 
Bill Curry (D), Connecticut State Comptroller
 Running mate: Joe Ganim, Mayor of Bridgeport
John G. Rowland (R), former U.S. Representative for CT-05
 Running mate: Jodi Rell, Member of the Connecticut House of Representatives
Eunice Groark (ACP), incumbent Lieutenant Governor of Connecticut
 Running mate: Audrey Rowe
Tom Scott (I), radio talk show host, and realtor
 Running mate: Glen O'Keefe

Polling

Results

References

Gubernatorial
1994
Connecticut